
The Cahill ministry (1959) or Fourth Cahill ministry was the 58th ministry of the New South Wales Government, and was led by the 29th Premier, Joe Cahill, of the Labor Party. The ministry was the fourth and final of four consecutive occasions when the Government was led by Cahill, as Premier.

Cahill was first elected to the New South Wales Legislative Assembly in 1925 and served until 1932, representing the seats of St George and Arncliffe before being defeated. He was re-elected in 1935, again representing Arncliffe, and then represented Cook's River between 1941 and 1959. Having served continuously as Secretary for Public Works in the first, second, and third ministries of Jim McGirr, when Deputy Premier Jack Baddeley resigned, Cahill was appointed as McGirr's deputy on 21 September 1949. McGirr resigned as Premier several years later, on 2 April 1952, and Cahill was elected as Labor Leader and became Premier.

Cahill led Labor to victory at the 1953, 1956, and 1959 state elections. Ministers mostly retained their portfolios from the second Cahill ministry. The main changes were that John McGrath retired at the 1959 election, William Gollan was dropped from the ministry, while Pat Hills and Norm Ryan were promoted. Some ministerial titles were changed, dropping colonial and changing secretary to minister for lands, mines and public works.

This ministry covers the period from 1 April when Cahill won the 1959 state election, until 28 October 1959. On 22 October 1959 Cahill, a heavy smoker, died at Sydney Hospital of a myocardial infarction while still serving as Premier. Cahill's deputy, Bob Heffron succeeded Cahill as Premier.

Composition of ministry

The composition of the ministry was announced by Premier Cahill following the 1959 state election on 1 April 1959, and covers the period until 28 October 1959, when the ministry was reconfigured as the First Heffron ministry.

 
Ministers are members of the Legislative Assembly unless otherwise noted.

See also

Notes

References

 

! colspan="3" style="border-top: 5px solid #cccccc" | New South Wales government ministries

New South Wales ministries
1959 establishments in Australia
1959 disestablishments in Australia
Australian Labor Party ministries in New South Wales